Battle of Tripoli Harbor may refer to:

First Battle of Tripoli Harbor, May 16, 1802
Second Battle of Tripoli Harbor, October 1803 – September 1804